The Brondyffryn Trust was a charity for autistic children based in Wales.

The trust was formed by parents and governors at Ysgol Plas Brondyffryn, a school for autistic children in Denbigh, Wales, in 2002, to raise money for residential facilities and a support centre for parents with autistic children.  It sought to raise £1.3 million for the residential facilities and £2.2 million to build a 16 plus college and parent centre. By May 2003, the Trust had raised £500,000 enabling work to begin on the residential phase of the project. Building was expected to begin in 2004, but following a failure to agree a partnership agreement with the local governing body Denbighshire County Council, by which the Trust would have financed the building of the residential centre and the furnishings while Denbighshire County Council would help to run the centre, the Trust was dissolved in March 2004.

References

Charities based in Wales